Richard E. DeVore, also written as Richard De Vore (1933 – 2006) was an American ceramicist, professor. He was known for stoneware. He was faculty at Cranbrook Academy of Art’s Ceramics Department, from 1966 to 1978.

Background and education 

Richard E. DeVore was born in Toledo, Ohio on April 27, 1933. He earned a bachelor of education degree with an art major from the University of Toledo in 1955, and received a master of fine arts degree from the Cranbrook Academy of Art in 1957. While in Michigan, he studied ceramics under Maija Grotell, an influential Finnish-born American ceramist.

Career 
In 1966, DeVore became head of the ceramics department at Cranbrook Academy of Art. He joined the Colorado State University art faculty in 1978 where he continued teaching until 2004.

In 1987, DeVore was installed as a fellow of the American Craft Council. Based in Fort Collins, Colorado, he was known for simple, organic forms finished in dull glazes that suggest polished stones, sun-bleached bones, or even translucent skin.

Death 
DeVore died from lung cancer in Fort Collins, Colorado on June 25, 2006.

Collections 
DeVore's ceramic works are represented at the following museum collections:

References

External links
Examples of DeVore's work at the Frank Lloyd Gallery

1933 births
2006 deaths
Deaths from lung cancer
People from Fort Collins, Colorado
Deaths from cancer in Colorado
University of Toledo alumni
Cranbrook Academy of Art alumni
Colorado State University faculty
20th-century American sculptors
American male sculptors
Sculptors from Colorado
20th-century American male artists